The 2018 West Coast Conference men's basketball tournament was the postseason men's basketball tournament for the West Coast Conference for the 2017–18 season. All tournament games were played at the Orleans Arena in Paradise, Nevada, from March 2–6, 2018. Regular-season champion Gonzaga won the tournament and with it the conference's automatic bid to the NCAA tournament.

Seeds
All ten teams in the West Coast Conference were eligible to compete in the conference tournament. The top six teams received a first-round bye. Teams were seeded by record within the conference, with a tiebreaker system to seed teams with identical conference records.

Schedule and results

Bracket

* indicates overtime period.

See also

West Coast Conference men's basketball tournament
2018 West Coast Conference women's basketball tournament

References

External links
2018 West Coast Conference Men's Basketball Championship

West Coast Conference men's basketball tournament
Tournament
West Coast Athletic Conference men's basketball tournament
West Coast Athletic Conference men's basketball tournament
Basketball competitions in the Las Vegas Valley
College basketball tournaments in Nevada
College sports tournaments in Nevada